, born , is the protagonist of Red Entertainment's action third-person shooter series Gungrave. Formerly a trusted member of the Millennion's Family who was killed by his best friend Harry McDowell, Brandon was revived as part of a result of experiments. Gungrave opens shortly after his resurrection, fifteen years after his death. Grave is a silent protagonist, receiving his mission and carrying it out without a word. He has reappeared in the multiple sequels Gungrave has had, where he faces new enemies alongside allies. The character has also appeared in the crossover game Chaos Wars and Madhouse's anime adaptation of the first game.

Beyond the Grave was created by manga artist Yasuhiro Nightow when staff members from Red Entertainment requested his help with the idea of Gungrave. Nightow chose Grave to be silent based on his preferences with video games and felt that his design became too difficult to animate. Across the sequels, the staff in charge of the games wanted to improve the Grave's appeal through his new actions and how he encounters enemies. Despite being silent, Grave sometimes talks with Tomokazu Seki being his Japanese voice actor while Kirk Thornton portrays him in the English dub of the series.

Critical reception to Beyond the Grave has been mixed. While game journalists have found his story in his debut simple, the character's design and powers as a gunner have received positive response, comparing him with other of Nightow's characters, most notably the ones from his manga Trigun. Critical response to his role in the anime adaptation of the game has been positive due to how the narrative handles his transformation from a street fighter to a ruthless mafia hitman and becoming Harry's enemy as his new undead persona, Grave, while still dealing with his friendship.

Creation and design

Beyond the Grave was created by manga artist Yasuhiro Nightow. During a convention in America he was approached by game developer Red Entertainment, who asked if there was a certain type of game Ihe was interested in making. In creating Grave, Nightow elaborated wanted him to be a silent person as he does not enjoy games where the main character talks too much. Nightow explained further influences in the making of the character and believed he was satisfied with the final result. He created Grave from his backside due to how the game would be designed and never thought about how hard it would be to animate him. When the Gungrave anime was released, Nightow noted the issues he made and made a brief plot summary for the staff. Nightow also took a liking to Grave's younger persona, Brandon Heat, being excited in a convention when he met a cosplayer of him. In Gungrave: Overdose the developers wanted to keep showing people Beyond the Grave, as "just how great" he is based on response from the original game. The character is voiced in Japanese by Tomokazu Seki and Kirk Thornton in English.

For Gungrave G.O.R.E., Kim Min Soo of Iggymob noted that there were difficulties in making enemies for the player as Beyond the Grave happened to have become a very powerful character across the series. As a result, Soo elaborated that while the enemies will "be hiding in buildings, as an example" to look for the right moment to strike", Grave would not care for their fates and kill them ruthlessly. The character's weaponry were made to the character stand out; Kim states "it doesn't just look cool, it also can be used to keep things, be used as a weapon, and such. It could be one of the things Grave unlocks in a “growth system”, where he can unlock some skills, so yes, there's skill trees in some form or another". Nightow to check the weapons the Grave can wield in combat. Iggymob also discussed the development process of Grave's new design, which was developed in collaboration with Nightow. In the game, Grave had various facial animations for expressing emotions. New fireweapons for Grave were designed by Nightow.

Story

Gungrave
The game Mika dragging an oversized attaché case toward a warehouse with difficulty. "Bloody" Harry Macdowell has just carried out a coup against Big Daddy, the leader of the Millennion organization. Grave uses two massive handguns under its stages as a series of missions issued by Dr. T, first to gather information on the current makeup of Millennion from a low-level street gang, and next destroying a research facility that creates Harry's undead soldiers. Grave comes into contact with the leadership of the Millenion organization—once friends and allies that he now faces as enemies with supernatural powers.

As the player progresses, the game uses anime cutscenes to reflect on the history of young Brandon and Harry, gradually bringing the pair's back story into focus. Close friends, the two had both become lieutenants in the Millennion organization, working directly under Big Daddy, the group's leader. Brandon shared a bond with Big Daddy and some flashbacks show the two sharing more of a father-son relationship. Brandon even let Big Daddy marry the woman he loved so that she could find a better life. Not content with the power he had been given, Harry asked Brandon to help him kill Big Daddy so that he could take over. When Brandon refused, Harry shot his friend in the left eye, killing him. Fifteen years later, Harry carried out his coup. His actions as leader inspired Dr. T to revive Brandon who was the only person capable of stopping Harry. Dr. T's connection to all of this is not made clear, but he often makes comments that indicate some connection to Brandon's former life. Grave picks apart the leadership of Millennion to make his way to Harry. At the top of the tower that Harry uses as a headquarters, it is revealed that Big Daddy still lives in the form of a twisted monster. Harry forces Grave to fight his creation, and following the final battle, Harry accepts his defeat graciously and allows his friend to kill him. With Harry defeated, Mika's protection becomes Grave's only concern, and to keep his promise to Big Daddy of protecting the family, Grave protects Mika while they drive away from this tragedy.

Gungrave: Overdose
Grave is reawakened by an older Mika Asagi. Sporting a new outfit, a new Coffin, and even more firepower than before, Grave silently goes forth to destroy the SEED narcotics empire controlled by the Corisione Family. Before his disappearance, he breaks his "silent protagonist" character by making only one sentence, "You must live, Mika".

Gungrave VR
This game is a prologue to Gungrave G.O.R.E, the third mainline entry that is in development. At the end of Gungrave: Overdose, Grave finally achieved peace and went back to sleep, but as time goes on, SEED starts to spread across a town again. Mika finds out about this, and hesitatingly wakes up Grave, and together they throw themselves into the heat of battle again.”

Gungrave VR U.N

Gungrave G.O.R.E
The game's story will revolve around Grave and Mika taking down the drug cartel Raven Clan that is spreading SEED throughout the world in effort to control humanity. Though they have been trying to take down SEED, this time Grave and Mika will be joined together with a small organization to form a new one called the El-Al Canhel.

Other appearances
The character also appears in the crossover role-playing game Chaos Wars alongside other characters with Gungrave: Overdose. DieHardGameFan enjoyed how he managed to get his own proper storyline despite not being the lead. The character's role in the first game has also been explored in Madhouse's anime series.

Reception

Critical reception to Beyond the Grave has been mixed in his introduction. Game Revolution regarded him as a "true hero" due to the skills he possesses, something the players would like control while describing him as an "arthritic Frankenstein" due to experiments have affected his nearly dead body. Nevertheless, his narrative was found common due to his journey to defeat mafia members with supernatural powers. GameSpot drew a similar statement, considering his looks as mix between "cowboy and a vampire" while still keeping a stylish look and liking his interactions with Mika. IGN enjoyed his main design, comparing it with Nightow's Trigun manga but more gothic and laballed him as "cool" due to the intense firepower he displays. In another review, IGN  described Grave as "the one notably detailed character model on screen at any given time, since most of the cannon fodder are given comparatively short shrift in the modeling department" and lamented his lack of more diverse moves. In a further analysis of the game while detailing the revenge story arcs as common in fiction, GameSpy found there is a common misinterpretation of Grave as an anti-hero but instead is portrayed as "the reformed gangster, whose loyalty and caring feelings toward those he loves gives him a type of nobility that allows him to somewhat transcend his bloodthirsty one-man war." GamePro enjoyed the character, but describing him as a "low-rent Max Payne".

Grave's return in Overdose was described by Eurogamer as a forced sequel due to how the plot recycles elements from his original portrayal. GameSpot enjoyed some segments of the game where Grave fights boss character in an appealing fashion. In retrospective, GameSpy he saw him as "undeniably cool, being the strong, silent, undead type" making him one of the best parts from the original game, while adding new sides for his personality in Overdose. While liking the character, IGN appreciated the new moves he was given alongside his new allies. GameZone also liked their "cool" appeal regardless of what happens in the gameplay. Despite criticism to the sequel Gungrave VR, PlayStation LifeStyle considered Grave to be still well designed. WorthPlaying lamented how Grave's new unlockable skin did not improve his skills.

Critics have also commented on the character's arc from Madhouse television series. Upon his introduction, Anime News Network panned his silent attitude displayed in the series' primitive, comparing him negatively with characters with a similar design. When the anime focused on his younger persona, Brandon Heat, ANN still felt it was hard to sympathize with him due to his calm demeanor and the anime's slow pace. Nevertheless, ANN looked forward to the time he and his best friend, Harry MacDowel, become enemies as foreshadowed. By the next review, the same site enjoyed how the character has taken action in Millennium organization alongside Harry while also finding his relationship with love interest Maria appealing. DVD Talk enjoyed the early tragic setting the cast are initially put into and, like how ANN, the two become invested in becoming powerful people. Mania Entertainment enjoyed the backstory due to how such friendly people, Brandon and Harry, would become enemies in the series, making it enjoyable. By a following DVD, Mania enjoyed Brandon's darker characterization as a result of being involved in Millennium and how his loyalty for his boss, Big Daddy, results in his tragedy that would later turn him into Grave. In the final review where Grave's lifespan is reaching its limit while facing Harry's forces was praised by the same site due to how the narrative further explores the friendship between the two main characters despite their current situation. In a more general review, DVD Talk enjoyed the handling of Brandon and Harry's story due to how it changes their personalities while going for enjoyable character arcs. Manga.Tokyo commented that the friendship between Brandon and Harry were the biggest appeal in the anime despite the setting being chaotic due to the quest the two characters face when becoming mafia. Hardcore Gaming 101 enjoyed how the anime corrupts the young Brandon and Harry when working for Millennium leading to the scene in which the former becomes Grave. IGN compared Brandon to Terminator due to his deadly skills but questioned how depressed he is about his job as a gangster and why he would not quit Millennium alongside his love interest. Tomokazu Seki's vocal performance as the two personas was also praised by Mania over the English dub, with Famitsu offering similar comments.

See also
Gungrave
Gungrave: Overdose
Gungrave (TV series)

References

Fictional elective mutes
Fictional marksmen and snipers
Fictional mass murderers
Gungrave
Male characters in anime and manga
Male characters in video games
Orphan characters in anime and manga
Orphan characters in video games
Science fiction video game characters
Third-person shooter characters
Silent protagonists
Undead characters in video games
Video game characters introduced in 2002
Video game protagonists
Western (genre) gunfighters